Lambdatorquevirus is a genus of viruses, in the family Anelloviridae. Sea lions serve as natural hosts. There are six species in this genus.

Taxonomy
The genus contains the following species:
Torque teno pinniped virus 1
Torque teno pinniped virus 2
Torque teno pinniped virus 3
Torque teno pinniped virus 5, previously named Torque teno zalophus virus 1
Torque teno pinniped virus 8
Torque teno pinniped virus 9

Structure
Viruses in Lambdatorquevirus are non-enveloped, with icosahedral geometries, and T=1 symmetry. The diameter is around 19-27 nm. Genomes are circular, around 2.1kb in length. The genome has 2 open reading frames.

Life cycle
Viral replication is nuclear. Entry into the host cell is achieved by penetration into the host cell. Replication follows the ssDNA rolling circle model. DNA-templated transcription, with some alternative splicing mechanism is the method of transcription. The virus exits the host cell by nuclear pore export. Sea lions serve as the natural host.

References

External links
 Viralzone: Lambdatorquevirus
 ICTV

Anelloviridae
Virus genera